The 1954–55 New York Rangers season was the franchise's 29th season. The season saw the Rangers finish in fifth place in the National Hockey League with a record of 17 wins, 35 losses, and 18 ties for 52 points.

Regular season

Final standings

Record vs. opponents

Schedule and results

|- align="center" bgcolor="#FFBBBB"
| 1 || 9 || @ Detroit Red Wings || 4–0 || 0–1–0
|- align="center" bgcolor="#CCFFCC"
| 2 || 10 || @ Chicago Black Hawks || 2–1 || 1–1–0
|- align="center" bgcolor="#FFBBBB"
| 3 || 14 || @ Boston Bruins || 5–3 || 1–2–0
|- align="center" bgcolor="#CCFFCC"
| 4 || 16 || @ Toronto Maple Leafs || 4–2 || 2–2–0
|- align="center" bgcolor="#CCFFCC"
| 5 || 20 || Boston Bruins || 6–2 || 3–2–0
|- align="center" bgcolor="#FFBBBB"
| 6 || 23 || @ Montreal Canadiens || 7–1 || 3–3–0
|- align="center" bgcolor="#CCFFCC"
| 7 || 24 || Montreal Canadiens || 4–2 || 4–3–0
|- align="center" bgcolor="#CCFFCC"
| 8 || 27 || Detroit Red Wings || 5–2 || 5–3–0
|- align="center" bgcolor="#FFBBBB"
| 9 || 30 || @ Toronto Maple Leafs || 3–1 || 5–4–0
|- align="center" bgcolor="white"
| 10 || 31 || Chicago Black Hawks || 1–1 || 5–4–1
|-

|- align="center" bgcolor="#FFBBBB"
| 11 || 4 || @ Chicago Black Hawks || 3–1 || 5–5–1
|- align="center" bgcolor="#FFBBBB"
| 12 || 7 || @ Detroit Red Wings || 1–0 || 5–6–1
|- align="center" bgcolor="#FFBBBB"
| 13 || 10 || Toronto Maple Leafs || 2–1 || 5–7–1
|- align="center" bgcolor="#FFBBBB"
| 14 || 13 || Chicago Black Hawks || 5–3 || 5–8–1
|- align="center" bgcolor="#CCFFCC"
| 15 || 14 || @ Chicago Black Hawks || 5–0 || 6–8–1
|- align="center" bgcolor="white"
| 16 || 17 || Boston Bruins || 2–2 || 6–8–2
|- align="center" bgcolor="#FFBBBB"
| 17 || 20 || @ Montreal Canadiens || 4–1 || 6–9–2
|- align="center" bgcolor="white"
| 18 || 21 || Toronto Maple Leafs || 2–2 || 6–9–3
|- align="center" bgcolor="#CCFFCC"
| 19 || 24 || Boston Bruins || 3–1 || 7–9–3
|- align="center" bgcolor="white"
| 20 || 25 || @ Boston Bruins || 2–2 || 7–9–4
|- align="center" bgcolor="#FFBBBB"
| 21 || 27 || @ Toronto Maple Leafs || 3–1 || 7–10–4
|- align="center" bgcolor="#CCFFCC"
| 22 || 28 || Montreal Canadiens || 4–1 || 8–10–4
|-

|- align="center" bgcolor="#FFBBBB"
| 23 || 1 || Detroit Red Wings || 6–1 || 8–11–4
|- align="center" bgcolor="#FFBBBB"
| 24 || 4 || @ Boston Bruins || 6–3 || 8–12–4
|- align="center" bgcolor="white"
| 25 || 5 || Montreal Canadiens || 3–3 || 8–12–5
|- align="center" bgcolor="#FFBBBB"
| 26 || 8 || Chicago Black Hawks || 2–1 || 8–13–5
|- align="center" bgcolor="#FFBBBB"
| 27 || 9 || @ Detroit Red Wings || 3–2 || 8–14–5
|- align="center" bgcolor="#FFBBBB"
| 28 || 11 || @ Detroit Red Wings || 4–1 || 8–15–5
|- align="center" bgcolor="white"
| 29 || 12 || Toronto Maple Leafs || 1–1 || 8–15–6
|- align="center" bgcolor="white"
| 30 || 15 || Detroit Red Wings || 3–3 || 8–15–7
|- align="center" bgcolor="#FFBBBB"
| 31 || 16 || @ Montreal Canadiens || 5–1 || 8–16–7
|- align="center" bgcolor="#FFBBBB"
| 32 || 18 || @ Toronto Maple Leafs || 3–1 || 8–17–7
|- align="center" bgcolor="white"
| 33 || 19 || Toronto Maple Leafs || 3–3 || 8–17–8
|- align="center" bgcolor="white"
| 34 || 22 || Detroit Red Wings || 2–2 || 8–17–9
|- align="center" bgcolor="#FFBBBB"
| 35 || 25 || @ Montreal Canadiens || 4–1 || 8–18–9
|- align="center" bgcolor="white"
| 36 || 26 || Chicago Black Hawks || 4–4 || 8–18–10
|- align="center" bgcolor="#CCFFCC"
| 37 || 30 || Boston Bruins || 6–1 || 9–18–10
|-

|- align="center" bgcolor="#FFBBBB"
| 38 || 1 || @ Boston Bruins || 4–0 || 9–19–10
|- align="center" bgcolor="white"
| 39 || 2 || Boston Bruins || 3–3 || 9–19–11
|- align="center" bgcolor="#FFBBBB"
| 40 || 5 || Chicago Black Hawks || 3–2 || 9–20–11
|- align="center" bgcolor="#FFBBBB"
| 41 || 8 || @ Toronto Maple Leafs || 5–0 || 9–21–11
|- align="center" bgcolor="#FFBBBB"
| 42 || 9 || Montreal Canadiens || 7–1 || 9–22–11
|- align="center" bgcolor="white"
| 43 || 12 || Toronto Maple Leafs || 0–0 || 9–22–12
|- align="center" bgcolor="#CCFFCC"
| 44 || 14 || @ Chicago Black Hawks || 6–2 || 10–22–12
|- align="center" bgcolor="#FFBBBB"
| 45 || 16 || @ Detroit Red Wings || 3–0 || 10–23–12
|- align="center" bgcolor="#CCFFCC"
| 46 || 19 || Detroit Red Wings || 2–0 || 11–23–12
|- align="center" bgcolor="#FFBBBB"
| 47 || 22 || @ Boston Bruins || 3–1 || 11–24–12
|- align="center" bgcolor="#CCFFCC"
| 48 || 23 || @ Boston Bruins || 2–0 || 12–24–12
|- align="center" bgcolor="white"
| 49 || 27 || @ Detroit Red Wings || 3–3 || 12–24–13
|- align="center" bgcolor="#CCFFCC"
| 50 || 29 || @ Toronto Maple Leafs || 3–1 || 13–24–13
|- align="center" bgcolor="#FFBBBB"
| 51 || 30 || @ Chicago Black Hawks || 4–2 || 13–25–13
|-

|- align="center" bgcolor="#FFBBBB"
| 52 || 5 || @ Montreal Canadiens || 3–1 || 13–26–13
|- align="center" bgcolor="#FFBBBB"
| 53 || 6 || Montreal Canadiens || 7–3 || 13–27–13
|- align="center" bgcolor="white"
| 54 || 9 || Chicago Black Hawks || 2–2 || 13–27–14
|- align="center" bgcolor="white"
| 55 || 12 || @ Boston Bruins || 5–5 || 13–27–15
|- align="center" bgcolor="#CCFFCC"
| 56 || 13 || Montreal Canadiens || 4–1 || 14–27–15
|- align="center" bgcolor="white"
| 57 || 16 || Boston Bruins || 2–2 || 14–27–16
|- align="center" bgcolor="#FFBBBB"
| 58 || 19 || @ Montreal Canadiens || 10–2 || 14–28–16
|- align="center" bgcolor="#FFBBBB"
| 59 || 20 || Detroit Red Wings || 5–0 || 14–29–16
|- align="center" bgcolor="#FFBBBB"
| 60 || 23 || Toronto Maple Leafs || 3–1 || 14–30–16
|- align="center" bgcolor="white"
| 61 || 25 || @ Chicago Black Hawks || 2–2 || 14–30–17
|- align="center" bgcolor="#FFBBBB"
| 62 || 27 || Montreal Canadiens || 7–1 || 14–31–17
|-

|- align="center" bgcolor="#FFBBBB"
| 63 || 2 || Boston Bruins || 2–1 || 14–32–17
|- align="center" bgcolor="#FFBBBB"
| 64 || 5 || @ Detroit Red Wings || 6–2 || 14–33–17
|- align="center" bgcolor="#FFBBBB"
| 65 || 6 || Detroit Red Wings || 2–1 || 14–34–17
|- align="center" bgcolor="#CCFFCC"
| 66 || 12 || @ Toronto Maple Leafs || 2–1 || 15–34–17
|- align="center" bgcolor="#CCFFCC"
| 67 || 13 || Chicago Black Hawks || 5–2 || 16–34–17
|- align="center" bgcolor="white"
| 68 || 16 || @ Chicago Black Hawks || 1–1 || 16–34–18
|- align="center" bgcolor="#FFBBBB"
| 69 || 19 || @ Montreal Canadiens || 4–2 || 16–35–18
|- align="center" bgcolor="#CCFFCC"
| 70 || 20 || Toronto Maple Leafs || 3–2 || 17–35–18
|-

Playoffs
The Rangers failed to qualify for the 1955 Stanley Cup playoffs.

Player statistics
Skaters

Goaltenders

†Denotes player spent time with another team before joining Rangers. Stats reflect time with Rangers only.
‡Traded mid-season. Stats reflect time with Rangers only.

Awards and records

Danny Lewicki, left wing, NHL Second Team All-Star

References

New York Rangers seasons
New York Rangers
New York Rangers
New York Rangers
New York Rangers
Madison Square Garden
1950s in Manhattan